LOB or LoB may refer to:

 Lancaster-Oslo-Bergen Corpus, of British English
 Left on base, a baseball term
 The Legacy of Brutality, a professional wrestling stable in Ohio Valley Wrestling
 "Legion of Boom" (Seattle Seahawks), a nickname for the defensive backfield of the American football team during the 2010s
 Limit order book
 Line of business, refers to LOB applications on mobile computers or PDAs
 Longbridge railway station, England, National Rail station code

See also
 Lob (disambiguation)